Doubtful Creek, formerly known as Doubtful River, a watercourse that is part of the Murrumbidgee catchment within the Murray–Darling basin, is located in the Snowy Mountains district of New South Wales, Australia.

See also

List of rivers of Australia
Rivers of New South Wales

References

External links
 

Rivers of New South Wales
Murray-Darling basin
Snowy Mountains